The 1989 Australian Rally Championship was a series of six rallying events held across Australia. It was the 22nd season in the history of the competition.

Greg Carr and navigator Mick Harker in a Lancia Delta Integrale won the 1989 Championship convincingly, with a record setting five wins from the six starts, giving Carr his third Australian Rally Championship title.  Murray Coote and Iain Stewart in the Mazda 323 4WD were consistently in the placings and finished the season on 81 points compared to Carr's 115.  Ross Dunkerton and Fred Gocentas in the Mitsubishi Galant VR-4 were the only other team to win an event, the final round in the ACT.

Season review
The 22nd Australian Rally Championship was held over six events across Australia, the season consisting of one event each for Tasmania, Victoria, Western Australia, South Australia, Queensland and Australian Capital Territory.

The Rallies
The six events of the 1989 season were as follows.

Round One – Rally Tasmania

Round Two – BP Alpine Rally

Round Three – BP Forest Rally

Round Four – Festival State Rally

Round Five – Caltex CXT Rally Queensland

Round Six – Esanda Finance Rally

1989 Drivers and Navigators Championships
Final pointscore for 1989 is as follows.

Greg Carr – Champion Driver 1989

Mick Harker – Champion Navigator 1989

References

External links
  Results of Snowy Mountains Rally and ARC results.

Rally Championship

Rally competitions in Australia
1989 in rallying